Jacob Volhard  (4 June 1834 – 14 January 1910) was the German chemist who discovered, together with his student Hugo Erdmann, the Volhard–Erdmann cyclization reaction. He was also responsible for the improvement of the Hell–Volhard–Zelinsky halogenation.

From 1852 to 1855 he studied chemistry at the University of Giessen, and afterwards, furthered his education at the University of Heidelberg. For two years he worked as an assistant under Justus von Liebig at the University of Munich, and in 1860/61 studied with August Wilhelm von Hofmann in London. In 1863 he obtained his habilitation at Munich, where he subsequently became an associate professor. In the meantime, he worked in the Institute of Plant Physiology at the Bavarian Academy of Sciences (1865–76). In 1879 he was named a professor of organic chemistry at the University of Erlangen, then in 1882 relocated to the University of Halle, where he served as a professor up until 1908.

Selected works 
 Die Begründung der Chemie durch Lavoisier, 1870 – The founding of chemistry by Antoine Lavoisier.
 Experiments in general chemistry and introduction to chemical analysis, 1889; Analytic tables by Clemens Zimmermann, translated by Edward Renouf.
 August Wilhelm von Hofmann : ein Lebensbild im Auftrage der Deutschen chemischen Gesellschaft, 1902 – Biography of August Wilhelm von Hofmann.
 Justus von Liebig (2 volumes, 1909) – Biography of Justus von Liebig.

See also
German inventors and discoverers

References

1834 births
1910 deaths
19th-century German chemists
Scientists from Darmstadt
People from the Grand Duchy of Hesse
University of Giessen alumni
Heidelberg University alumni
Academic staff of the Ludwig Maximilian University of Munich
Academic staff of the University of Erlangen-Nuremberg
Academic staff of the Martin Luther University of Halle-Wittenberg